Słupsk is a Polish parliamentary constituency in the Pomeranian Voivodeship.  It elects fourteen members of the Sejm.

The district has the number '26' for elections to the Sejm and is named after the city of Słupsk.  It includes the counties of Bytów, Chojnice, Człuchów, Kartuzy, Kościerzyna, Lębork, Puck, Słupsk, and Wejherowo, and the city counties of Gdynia and Słupsk.

List of members

2019-2023

Footnotes

Electoral districts of Poland
Pomeranian Voivodeship
Gdynia